Gregory was the fourth Bulgarian Patriarch of the Bulgarian Orthodox Church.
Gregory of Bulgaria was Patriarch during driving Simeon I of Bulgaria when Bulgaria was in her golden century.

References

Patriarchs of Bulgaria
10th-century Bulgarian people